Workers' Revolutionary Party (PRT) was a Spanish trotskyist political party founded in 1994 by the merger of the Workers' Socialist Party (Socialist Truth) (PST (LVS)) and the Group for Building a Revolutionary Workers' Party (GPOR). Both parties initially contested the 1994 European Parliament election as the GPOR–PST (LVS) coalition. The PRT eventually joined United Left (IU) in 1998, and in 2002 it merged with Revolutionary Left (IR) to form the Workers' Revolutionary Party–Revolutionary Left (PRT–IR).

Member parties
Workers' Socialist Party (Socialist Truth) (PST (LVS))
Group for Building a Revolutionary Workers' Party (GPOR)

References

Communist parties in Spain
1994 establishments in Spain
Political parties established in 1994
1998 disestablishments in Spain
Political parties disestablished in 1998